The Murder at the Vicarage is a work of detective fiction by British writer  Agatha Christie, first published in the UK by the Collins Crime Club in October 1930 and in the US by Dodd, Mead and Company later in the same year. The UK edition retailed at seven shillings and sixpence and the US edition at $2.00.

It is the first novel to feature the character of Miss Marple and her village of St Mary Mead. This first look at St Mary Mead led a reviewer in 1990 to ask why these are called cosy mysteries: "Our first glimpse of St Mary Mead, a hotbed of burglary, impersonation, adultery and ultimately murder. What is it precisely that people find so cosy about such stories?"

The character had previously appeared in short stories published in magazines starting in December 1927. These earlier stories were collected in book form in The Thirteen Problems in 1932.

Plot summary
The Reverend Leonard Clement, the vicar of St Mary Mead, narrates the story. He lives with his much younger wife Griselda and their nephew Dennis. Colonel Lucius Protheroe, Clement's churchwarden, is a wealthy, abrasive man who also serves as the local magistrate, and is widely disliked in the village. At dinner one evening, Clement offhandedly remarks that anyone who killed Protheroe would be doing the world a favour.

One day Clement encounters Protheroe's wife, Anne, embracing Lawrence Redding, a young visiting artist; while promising them that he will not reveal their affair, he advises Redding to leave the village at once. The next day, Clement is scheduled to meet with Protheroe to go over irregularities in the church accounts. Clement is called away to a farm to visit a dying parishioner, but learns that the man has recovered, and that nobody actually asked for him. Upon returning home, Clement encounters a distressed Redding at the gate to the vicarage, then discovers Colonel Protheroe dead at the writing desk in his study. He summons Dr Haydock, who pronounces that Protheroe was killed by a gunshot to the back of the head.

The police, led by Colonel Melchett and Inspector Slack, are confounded by several details, including a note left by Protheroe that seems to conflict with Haydock's opinion of the time of death, and some witnesses claiming to have heard a shot out in the woods, but no gunshot near or within the house. News spreads quickly, and both Lawrence Redding and Anne Protheroe confess to the murder. However, both are exonerated; Redding because he insists on an inaccurate time of death, and Anne because Miss Marple clearly saw that she was not carrying a pistol. Other suspects include Archer, a man treated harshly by Protheroe for poaching; Mrs Lestrange, a mysterious woman who recently appeared in the village; Dr Stone, an archaeologist excavating a barrow on Protheroe's land; and Stone's young assistant, Miss Cram.

Miss Marple tells Clement she has a list of seven possible suspects in mind. Miss Marple sees Miss Cram carrying a suitcase into the woods at midnight, which Clement later finds, along with a small crystal of picric acid. The suitcase proves to contain valuable silver belonging to the Protheroes, and "Dr Stone" turns out to be an impostor, having stolen the identity of a real archaeologist and replaced the Protheroes' belongings with replicas.

Reporters descend on the village as other strange occurrences take place. Mrs Price Ridley receives a threatening phone call, and Anne Protheroe discovers a portrait in a spare room slashed to pieces with a knife. A police handwriting expert examines the victim's note and determines that Colonel Protheroe did not write it. Clement is inspired to give a far more vigorous sermon than usual, after which he receives a call from Hawes, his sickly curate, who says he has something to confess.

Clement arrives at Hawes's rooms to find him dying from an overdose. He discovers the real note Protheroe was writing when he was killed, which reveals that Hawes was responsible for stealing money from the church accounts. Melchett arrives and calls Dr Haydock, but the operator accidentally connects him to Miss Marple, who arrives to see if she can help.

While Haydock takes Hawes to a hospital, Miss Marple explains her theory about the true murderer. Her seven suspects are revealed to be Archer; Mary, the Clements' maid, who had the opportunity; Lettice Protheroe, the Colonel's daughter, who could not stand him; Dennis, whose alibi about a tennis party failed to hold up; either Hawes or Clement, to prevent the Colonel from investigating the church accounts; or Griselda, who is revealed to have returned on an earlier train the day of the murder. However, none of them are guilty.

Miss Marple believes the true killers to be Lawrence Redding and Anne Protheroe. In love with Anne, Redding decided they could be together only if he removed her husband. On the pretext of seeking advice from Clement, he left his pistol in a potted plant holder at the vicarage. He then planted the picric acid crystal in the woods near the vicarage, rigging it to explode and create a "second gunshot" that would confuse any witnesses. In the evening, Redding placed the false call to Clement to get him out of the house, while Anne walked past Miss Marple's home without a handbag in close-fitting clothing to show that she was not carrying a gun. She retrieved the pistol (which had been fitted with a silencer), killed her husband, and left the vicarage; Redding then entered, stole the note incriminating Hawes, and planted his own note falsifying the time of death.

Both conspirators confessed to the crime with obvious falsehoods in their stories, appearing to exonerate each other. Redding drugged Hawes and planted the Colonel's note to make it appear as though Hawes committed suicide out of guilt. Fortunately, Dr Haydock saves the life of Hawes. Miss Marple proposes a trap which tricks Redding into incriminating himself; he and Anne are arrested by Inspector Slack's men.
 
The ending wraps up all loose ends. Lettice reveals that Mrs Lestrange is her mother, Colonel Protheroe's first wife, who is terminally ill; Lettice destroyed the portrait of Lestrange in Protheroe's house so the police would not suspect her. The two depart so that Lestrange can spend her last days travelling the world. Miss Cram is revealed to have known nothing about the false Dr Stone's plot, and Griselda and Dennis confess to having threatened Mrs Price Ridley as a practical joke. Griselda reveals that she is pregnant, which Miss Marple deduced.

Alongside the murder mystery plot, the novel takes time to consider alternative perspectives on the idea of crime. Miss Marple's nephew, Raymond West, attempts to solve the crime via Freudian psychoanalysis, while Dr Haydock expresses his view that criminal behaviour is a disease that will soon be solved by doctors instead of police.

Characters

 Miss Marple: spinster living in St Mary Mead, next to the vicar. She is observant and knows human behaviour, is recognised in her village as astute and generally correct.
Colonel Lucius Protheroe: wealthy man, who is the churchwarden and the local magistrate in St Mary Mead who lives at the Old Hall. He has grown deaf, and shouts a lot as a result.
Anne Protheroe: second wife of Colonel Protheroe, young and attractive.
Lettice Protheroe: Colonel Protheroe's teenage daughter from his first marriage.
Leonard Clement: the vicar of St Mary Mead and narrator of the story, in his early forties.
Griselda Clement: the vicar's young wife, 25 years old and a happy person.
Dennis Clement: the vicar's teenage nephew, part of his household.
Mary Adams: the vicar's housemaid and cook. She is going out with Bill Archer.
Mr Hawes: curate to vicar Clement, newly arrived in the parish. He had suffered acute Encephalitis lethargica prior to coming to St Mary Mead.
Mrs Martha Price Ridley: widow and gossip who lives next to the Vicarage, at the end of the road.
Miss Amanda Hartnell: spinster in St Mary Mead. 
Miss Caroline Wetherby: spinster in St Mary Mead who lives next to Miss Hartnell.
Dr Haydock: doctor living in St Mary Mead.
Lawrence Redding: a painter who fought in World War I. He uses a building on the vicarage property as his studio.
Mrs Estelle Lestrange: elegant woman who recently came to the village, who keeps to herself.
 Raymond West: Miss Marple's nephew, a writer who normally lives in London.
Rose and Gladdie: parlour maid and kitchen maid respectively at Old Hall, Colonel Protheroe’s house. Gladdie shared with Redding what she overheard when Mrs Lestrange visited Old Hall.
Bill Archer: local man who has been jailed periodically by Protheroe in his role as magistrate, for poaching.
Inspector Slack: the local police detective, who is very active despite his name, and often abrasive.
Colonel Melchett: Chief Constable for the county.
Dr Stone: an archaeologist carrying out a dig on Colonel Protheroe's land.
Gladys Cram: Dr Stone's secretary, in her early twenties.

Literary significance and reception

The Times Literary Supplement of 6 November 1930 posed the various questions as to who could have killed Protheroe and why, and concluded, "As a detective story, the only fault of this one is that it is hard to believe the culprit could kill Prothero [sic] so quickly and quietly. The three plans of the room, garden, and village show that almost within sight and hearing was Miss Marple, who 'always knew every single thing that happened and drew the worst inferences.' And three other 'Parish cats' (admirably portrayed) were in the next three houses. It is Miss Marple who does detect the murderer in the end, but one suspects she would have done it sooner in reality".

The review of the novel in The New York Times Book Review of 30 November 1930 begins, "The talented Miss Christie is far from being at her best in her latest mystery story. It will add little to her eminence in the field of detective fiction." The review went on to say that, "the local sisterhood of spinsters is introduced with much gossip and click-clack. A bit of this goes a long way and the average reader is apt to grow weary of it all, particularly of the amiable Miss Marple, who is sleuth-in-chief of the affair." The reviewer summarised the set-up of the plot and concluded, "The solution is a distinct anti-climax."

H C O'Neill in The Observer of 12 December 1930 said that, "here is a straightforward story which very pleasantly draws a number of red herrings across the docile reader's path. There is a distinct originality in her new expedient for keeping the secret. She discloses it at the outset, turns it inside out, apparently proves that the solution cannot be true, and so produces an atmosphere of bewilderment."

In the Daily Express of 16 October 1930 Harold Nicolson said, "I have read better works by Agatha Christie, but that does not mean that this last book is not more cheerful, more amusing, and more seductive than the generality of detective novels." In a short review dated 15 October 1930, the Daily Mirror review declared, "Bafflement is well sustained."

Robert Barnard wrote sixty years later that this is "Our first glimpse of St Mary Mead, a hotbed of burglary, impersonation, adultery and ultimately murder. What is it precisely that people find so cosy about such stories?" He found the resolution a bit hard to believe, yet the story is more appealing to readers of 1990 than to those in 1930. "The solution boggles the mind somewhat, but there are too many incidental pleasures to complain, and the strong dose of vinegar in this first sketch of Miss Marple is more to modern taste than the touch of syrup in later presentations."

Christie herself later wrote: "Reading Murder at the Vicarage now, I am not so pleased with it as I was at the time. It has, I think, far too many characters, and too many sub-plots. But at any rate the main plot is sound."

Allusions in other novels
The vicar and his wife, Leonard and Griselda Clement, who make their first appearance in this novel, continue to appear in Miss Marple stories. Notably, they feature in The Body in the Library (1942) along with Slack and Melchett, and 4.50 from Paddington (1957).

The character of Miss Marple had previously appeared in short stories published in magazines starting in December 1927. These earlier stories were collected in book form in The Thirteen Problems in 1932.

Adaptations to other media

The Murder at the Vicarage (1949 play)
The story was adapted into a play by Moie Charles and Barbara Toy in 1949 and opened at the Playhouse Theatre on 16 December 1949. Miss Marple was played by Barbara Mullen.

Television adaptations

British adaptations
The BBC adapted the book into a film which was first broadcast on 25 December 1986, with Joan Hickson as Miss Marple, Paul Eddington as the vicar, and Polly Adams as Anne Protheroe. The adaptation was generally very close to the original novel with four major exceptions: the trap which exposes the killer is changed to involve another murder attempt, the characters of Dennis, Dr Stone, and Gladys Cram were deleted, Bill Archer is present in the kitchen while the murder takes place, and Anne commits suicide out of remorse instead of being tried.

It was presented again in the ITV series Agatha Christie's Marple by Granada Television in 2004 with Geraldine McEwan as Miss Marple, Tim McInnerny as the vicar, Derek Jacobi as Colonel Protheroe, and Janet McTeer as Anne. This version eliminates the characters of Dr Stone and Gladys Cram, replacing them with the elderly French Professor Dufosse and his granddaughter Hélène. Other changes include the elimination of Miss Weatherby, the changing of Mrs Price-Ridley's first name from Martha to Marjorie, the renaming of Bill Archer to Frank Tarrent, changing the false gun shot to a shot by a double-barrelled shotgun and the addition of a plotline in which the Colonel stole 10,000 francs from the French Resistance, which led to the death of an agent. Two major departures from the book are the portrayal of Miss Marple as Anne's close friend and the addition of a series of flashbacks to December 1915, when a younger Miss Marple (played by Julie Cox) was engaged in a love affair with a married soldier.

In both versions, the vicar's role is reduced and he does not participate in the investigation since his presence as the narrator was unnecessary in a filmed version.

French adaptation
The novel was adapted as a 2016 episode of the French television series Les Petits Meurtres d'Agatha Christie.

Radio adaptation

The book was adapted for radio by Michael Bakewell, with June Whitfield as Miss Marple, Francis Matthews as the Rev. Leonard Clement, Imelda Staunton as Griselda Clement, and Frances Jeater as Anne Protheroe. This adaptation was first broadcast by the BBC in 1993.

Graphic novel adaptation
The Murder at the Vicarage was released by HarperCollins as a graphic novel adaptation on 20 May 2008, adapted and illustrated by "Norma" (Norbert Morandière). This was translated from the edition first published in France by Emmanuel Proust éditions in 2005 under the title of L'Affaire Prothéroe.

Publication history
 1930, Collins Crime Club (London), October 1930, Hardcover, 256 pp
 1930, Dodd Mead and Company (New York), 1930, Hardcover, 319 pp
 1948, Penguin Books, Paperback, (Penguin number 686), 255 pp
 1948, Dell Books (New York), Paperback, 223 pp
 1961, Fontana Books (Imprint of HarperCollins), Paperback, 191 pp
 1976, Greenway edition of collected works (William Collins), Hardcover, 251 pp, 
 1978, Greenway edition of collected works (Dodd Mead and Company), Hardcover, 251 pp
 1980, Ulverscroft Large Print Edition, Hardcover, 391 pp, 
 2005, Marple Facsimile edition (Facsimile of 1930 UK first edition), 12 September 2005, Hardcover, 

The novel was first serialised in the US in the Chicago Tribune in fifty-five instalments from Monday, 18 August to Monday, 20 October 1930.

Book dedication
The dedication of the book reads:
"To Rosalind"

The subject of this dedication is Christie's daughter, Rosalind Hicks (1919–2004) who was the daughter of her first marriage to Archibald Christie (1890–1962) and Agatha Christie's only child. Rosalind was eleven years of age at the time of the publication of the book.

References

External links
 The Murder at the Vicarage at the official Agatha Christie website
 
 

1930 British novels
British novels adapted into films
Miss Marple novels
British novels adapted into television shows
Novels first published in serial form
Works originally published in the Chicago Tribune
Collins Crime Club books
First-person narrative novels